The list of shipwrecks in July 1825 includes some ships sunk, wrecked or otherwise lost during July 1825.

1 July

3 July

4 July

5 July

7 July

8 July

10 July

11 July

12 July

14 July

16 July

17 July

18 July

19 July

20 July

22 July

26 July

27 July

29 July

30 July

31 July

Unknown date

References

1825-07